Bogdan Zebega Suman (born 21 February 1984 in Bârlad) is a retired Romanian rugby union player.

Club career
Zebega only played for CSA Steaua București in the Romanian Rugby Championship.

International career
He had 35 caps for Romania, from 2004 to 2011, scoring 3 tries, 15 points on aggregate. He was called for the 2011 Rugby World Cup, playing in two games, one as a substitute, but without scoring. He has been absent from the National Team since then.

References

External links

1984 births
Living people
Sportspeople from Bârlad
Romanian rugby union players
Romania international rugby union players
Rugby union hookers
CSA Steaua București (rugby union) players
București Wolves players